Sunday stone is an artificial stone composed of porous barium sulfate that formed on the walls of drainage pipes of some coal mines. It is striped due to differing levels of coal dust produced during the day and night shifts. In some cases there is a broader stripe generated every seven days due to active mining not taking place on a Sunday. Broader stripes would also appear when work stopped for other reasons. In one case a broad stripe was found to coincide with workers being given the day off to view a cock fight. Breaks of more than a day would produce an even broader stripe such as when Christmas fell on a Monday.

The Sunday stone would over time block the drainage pipes necessitating their replacement. Where mines have improved ventilation, reducing the level of coal dust in the air, Sunday stone has ceased to be formed.

References

Coal mining